Endozepines are endogenous compounds with benzodiazepine like effects. They have been linked to hepatic encephalopathy and have controversially been linked to some cases of recurrent stupor. Initially, the key diagnostic test is stupor which is sensitive to the benzodiazepine receptor antagonist flumazenil in the absences of exogenous benzodiazepines.

Potential candidates for these compounds are:
 oleamides
 nonpeptidic endozepines
 the protein Diazepam binding inhibitor (DBI)

References

Neurotransmitters
Neuropeptides